Sri Lanka is home to 34 endemic bird species. The number of bird species recorded in the island is 492 of which 219 are breeding residents. BirdLife International recognize Sri Lanka as one of the world's Endemic Bird Areas (EBAs). The number of endemic species has changed over the years. This is largely due to "close taxonomic revisions". The number of endemic species has fluctuated from 20 to 47. Since 1977 the number has settled at around 21. The figure was increased to 23 in 1990. Many authorities have accepted this figure since then. Wijesinghe published A Checklist of the Birds of Sri Lanka in 1994 which considered the addition of three more species, but this move did not receive widespread recognition because its rationale was not in keeping with rigorous taxonomic practice. Subsequent publications on the avifauna of Sri Lanka and the South Asia region have not listed these three as endemics. However, within some Sri Lankan circles considered the endemics proposed by Wijesinghe as acceptable. This may be due to an over-enthusiasm in increasing endemic numbers to create a better ornithological image and increase the demand for commercial birdwatching.

In 2001, Deepal Warakagoda and Pamela C. Rasmussen described a new bird species, the Serendib scops-owl (Otus thilohofmanni). This is the first new bird species discovered in Sri Lanka since 1868, when the Sri Lanka whistling-thrush (Myophonus blighi) was described. There are some proposals for species level taxonomic revisions, and therefore endemic status in Sri Lanka. The country prefix "Sri Lanka" in common names is normally restricted to endemic species. However Sarath Kotagama et al. (2006) disagree with Sibley and Monroe (1990) on the use of "Ceylon" in common species' names, suggesting instead that they should reflect the change of the official English name of the island from Ceylon to name Sri Lanka. Sibley and Monroe's rationale was "Ceylon"  is the geographical unit and "Sri Lanka" is the country which occupies the island. The geographical name is normally used for animal ranges, for example Madagascar is used rather than its nation, the Malagasy Republic."

Change in number of endemics

Source: Kotagama et al., 2013

Endemic species
Species which are validly published are considered as definitive endemic species. Others are included with question marks.

Source: Kotagama, 2013

Proposed endemics
Rasmussen and Anderton (2005) proposed a number of species splits. Those that would create new endemic species for Sri Lanka are listed below along with their present taxon.

Source: Kaluthota and Kotagama, 2009

References

Literature cited

 02
.Birds
Birds, endemic
Birds, endemic
Sri Lanka
Sri Lanka